The governor of Uttarakhand is appointed by the president of India for a term of five years, and holds office at the president's pleasure. The governor is de jure head of the state government; all its executive actions are taken in the governor's name. However, the governor must act on the advice of the popularly elected Uttarakhand Council of Ministers, headed by the chief minister of Uttarakhand, who thus hold de facto executive authority at the state-level. The Constitution of India also empowers the governor to act upon his or her own discretion, such as the ability to appoint or dismiss a ministry, recommend President's rule, or reserve bills for the president's assent. The governor of Uttarakhand has their official residences at the Raj Bhavans in Dehradun and Nainital.

Uttarakhand was created on 9 November 2000, when it was carved out from the Himalayan districts of Uttar Pradesh. Seven people have served as the state's governor, five are men and two women including Baby Rani Maurya.

Qualifications
Article 157 and Article 158 of the Constitution of India specify eligibility requirements for the post of governor. They are as follows:

A governor must:

 be a citizen of India.
 be at least 35 years of age.
 not be a member of either house of the parliament or house of the state legislature.
 not hold any office of profit.

Powers and functions

The governor enjoys many different types of powers:

Executive powers related to administration, appointments and removals,
Legislative powers related to lawmaking and the state legislature, that is Vidhan Sabha (legislative assembly) & vidhan parishad, and
Discretionary powers to be carried out according to the discretion of the governor.

List of the governors of Uttarakhand

Following is the list of the governors of Uttarakhand since its inception on 9 November 2000:

Timeline

See also
 Government of Uttarakhand
 Chief Minister of Uttarakhand
 Uttarakhand Legislative Assembly
 Speaker of the Uttarakhand Legislative Assembly
 Leader of the Opposition in the Uttarakhand Legislative Assembly
 Cabinet of Uttarakhand
 Chief Justice of Uttarakhand
 List of current Indian governors
 List of presidents of India

References

External links
 India States
 Official website

Uttarakhand
 
Governors